Sousceyrac-en-Quercy (literally Sousceyrac in Quercy; Languedocien: Soçairac en Carcin) is a commune in the department of Lot, southern France. The municipality was established on 1 January 2016 by merger of the former communes of Sousceyrac, Calviac, Comiac, Lacam-d'Ourcet and Lamativie.

See also 
Communes of the Lot department

References 

Communes of Lot (department)